Ryker Evans (born on December 13, 2001) is a Canadian professional Ice hockey defenceman for the Coachella Valley Firebirds of the American Hockey League (AHL) as a prospect to the Seattle Kraken of the National Hockey League (NHL). He was selected with the 35th overall pick by the Kraken in the 2021 NHL Entry Draft. He also played with the Regina Pats of the Western Hockey League (WHL).

Playing career
In 2016, Ryker was selected with the 209th selection in the WHL Bantam Draft. In the 2018–19 WHL season, he played 45 games, scoring 1 goal and 10 assists for 11 points in his 1st season with Regina. In the 2020–21 season, he was named assistant captain of the Pats. In the 2021–22 season, still with the Pats, he registered 61 points in 63 games. 

On April 22 2022, Evans signed a three-year, entry-level contract, worth $925,000 per season, until the 2024–25 NHL season.

References

External links
  

2001 births
Living people
Coachella Valley Firebirds players
Regina Pats players
Seattle Kraken draft picks